Generation Climate Europe (GCE) is a coalition of major European youth organizations aiming to advocate together toward the European institutions for more climate action.

History 
Generation Climate Europe was launched in September 2019. The founding members of GCE are FIMCAP Europe, ESU, YEE, Climates and AEGEE. In the meanwhile, a series of other major youth organizations have joined the coalition.

Core demands 
Generation Climate Europe was founded to unite the voices and efforts of Europe's major IYNGOs to advocate together toward the European institutions for more climate action. The coalition has formulated the following core demands:

 The European shall declare a climate emergency. Climate action needs to be mainstreamed in the policies of the EU. All  decisions shall be evaluated on their climate impact.
 Young people shall be included in decision-making processes like the process of drafting the European Green Deal. 
 The EU shall enhance its Nationally Determined Contribution (NDC) before 2020 to align with a maximum 1.5 °C increase. The EU should also immediately adopt a long-term climate strategy for carbon neutrality, at the latest at the next European Council in October 2019.
 Fossil fuel subsidies and new fossil fuel projects shall be terminated immediately. The EU needs a fast and comprehensive transition to clean renewable energy only.
 The costs incurred by the transition to a more sustainable society and economy in the short-term must be distributed in a socially equitable manner. Those who can afford the most need to commit the most.
 GCE demands that more investment and focus is put into providing Europe wide sustainable transport networks. The current infrastructure shall be modernised in order to keep up with the demand for sustainable travel and to lower transport costs. Night trains should be reintroduced and a tax on kerosene should be implemented.
 More emphasis shall be placed on education as a means to empower the youth and give them the tools to achieving a carbon-neutral and circular economy.

Member organizations

References 

2019 in the environment
2020 in the environment
Climate change protests
Youth
European Union
Fimcap